HB4 wheat is a type of wheat that has been genetically modified by introducing sunflower genes, with the objective of improving crop productivity. Wheat, along with corn and soybeans, constitute the basis of world food, and different scientific research was focused on improving its productivity. The improvements in food production achieved in the 90's agricultural production could equal the food demand of the world population, thanks to different technological improvements.

History 
In 2004 a team led by Dr. Raquel Chan, Director of Instituto de Agrobiotecnología del Litoral de la Universidad Nacional del Litoral, and members of CONICET jointly patented with the Bioceres agrotechnological group, a genetic construct that years later would give rise to IND-ØØ412-7 wheat (known as HB4 wheat or as "genetically modified wheat"). This variety of wheat is produced through genetic engineering (also called transgenic) and is characterized by its response to drought conditions. The seed was designed with the intention of withstanding longer periods of stress without stopping the accumulation of biomass, improving crop stability and increasing yield.

Characteristics 
The HB4 gene introduced into wheat comes from the sunflower and encodes the protein HAHB4​​ (Helianthus Annuus Homeobox-4) which, being a transcription factor (TF), binds to specific sequences of wheat DNA and regulates the expression of certain genes. The HAHB4 protein belongs to a family of transcription factors whose levels are naturally increased by various types of environmental stress, particularly drought stress.

In event IND-ØØ412-7, this regulation causes a delay in the entry of the plant to the deterioration process known as senescence, giving it some time to wait for the return of normal water availability. This means that it regulates the sensitivity of the protection mechanisms that are triggered in the absence of this essential resource for the plant.

HB4 around the world 
HB4 wheat was created to tolerate droughts. These characteristics result in increased yield compared to unmodified varieties. This technology has been approved in the following countries:

 Argentina in 2020
 Brazil 2021
 United States in 2022
 Australia and New Zealand in 2022
 Nigeria in 2022
 Colombia in 2022

Background 
Wheat is a natural hybrid derived from interspecies breeding. It has been theorized that the ancestors of wheat (Triticum monococcum, Aegilops speltoides and Aegilops tauschii, all diploid grasses) naturally hybridized over millennia somewhere in western Asia, to create natural polyploid hybrids, the best known of which are the common wheat and durum wheat.

Wheat (Triticum spp.) is an important domestic grass used throughout the world for food. Its evolution has been influenced by human intervention since the dawn of agriculture.

Interspecies gene transference continued to occur in farmers' fields during the shift from the Paleolithic diet to the diet adopted by humans after the Neolithic Revolution or the first Green Revolution. During the transition from a hunter-gatherer social structure from foragers to more agrarian societies, humans began to grow wheat and transform it to meet their needs. Thus, the social and cultural roots of humans and the development of wheat have been intertwined since before recorded history.

This process gave rise to several species of wheat that are grown for specific purposes and climates. In 1873, Wilson cultivated cross strains of rye and wheat to create triticale. Additional transformations using cytogenic hybridization techniques allowed Norman Borlaug, father of the second Green Revolution, to develop species of wheat (the semidwarf varieties) that would grow in harsh environments.

Recombinant DNA techniques were developed in the 1980s, work began to create the first transgenic wheat, coinciding with the third green revolution. Of the three most important cereals in the world (corn, rice and wheat), wheat was last transformed by transgenic, biolistic methods in 1992, and by Agrobacterium methods in 1997. Unlike maize and rice, its widespread use in the human diet has faced cultural resistance.

References 

Wheat